Anne Leueen Willoughby is a Canadian former actress. Her father was a representative of the Guinness family who helped supervise the construction of the Lions' Gate Bridge and extensive housing developments on Vancouver's North Shore. She attended the University of British Columbia in Vancouver, and later graduated from the Bristol Old Vic's theater school.

Background
Two of her most notable roles are Barbara in Omen III: The Final Conflict (1981), and Leueen (a character who took on the actress' name during production), Lois Lane's fellow Daily Planet reporter in Superman II (1980). Her character, incidentally, is not present in Richard Donner's version of the Superman movie. Willoughby also appeared in a small role in the first Superman movie, playing an unnamed secretary, and was one of the voice actors who worked on the original BBC radio production of The Hitchhiker's Guide to the Galaxy, amongst other roles in British and Canadian theater, film and television. In 1986, she won the ACTRA Award as Best Television Actress for her performance as a young woman battling cancer in the CBC miniseries The Other Kingdom.

Filmography

References

External links

Canadian film actresses
Canadian voice actresses
Living people
Year of birth missing (living people)
20th-century Canadian actresses